The 1922 Kalamazoo football team represented Kalamazoo College during the 1922 college football season.  In Ralph H. Young's sixth year as head coach, Kalamazoo compiled a 4–4–1 record, and outscored their opponents 96 to 92.

Schedule

References

Kalamazoo
Kalamazoo Hornets football seasons
Kalamazoo football